Turgut Reis Mosque (or Karagöl Camii) is a mosque in Balchik, Bulgaria. Dragut (Turgut Reis) was caught in a strong storm in the Black Sea and prayed, saying that he will build a mosque when he gets rid of this storm. And he reached the town of Balchik and did build the Turgut Reis Mosque.

Gallery

References

Mosques in Bulgaria
Buildings and structures in Dobrich Province
Balchik